František "Frank" Daniel (April 14, 1926 – February 29, 1996) was a Czech-American screenwriter, film director and teacher.  He is known for developing the sequence paradigm of screenwriting, in which a classically constructed movie can be broken down into three acts, and a total of eight specific sequences. He served as co-chair of the Columbia University film program, and as a dean of FAMU, the American Film Institute and the USC School of Cinema-Television. He was also an Artistic Director of the Sundance Institute.

Life

Czechoslovakia
František Daniel was born in Kolín, Czechoslovakia. He earned a master's degree in music before studying film at VGIK in Moscow. Daniel was a member of a production unit Feix-Daniel at state-owned Barrandov Studios. In addition to that he wrote screenplays and taught screenwriting at FAMU. Among his students were Miloš Forman, Věra Chytilová or Pavel Juráček. In 1959 he had to leave Barrandov after the movies he worked on were criticised for having "liberal tendencies" by František Kahuda.
In 1956, Daniel and Miloš Kratochvíl published the screenwriting textbook Cesta za filmovým dramatem. In 1965, he produced The Shop on Main Street, which won an Oscar for the best foreign language film. In 1968 he served as dean of the Faculty of Film and Television – FAMU, part of the Academy of Performing Arts in Prague.

United States

Daniel first toured the United States at the behest of W. McNeil Lowry of the Ford Foundation, who commissioned him to do a survey of film education in the United States and make recommendations for its future development. Daniel subsequently immigrated to the United States in 1969 after the Warsaw Pact invasion of Czechoslovakia. In 1969 he became the first dean of the American Film Institute, where he taught David Lynch and Terrence Malick.

Daniel left the Institute in 1976 to become Henry Luce Professor at Carleton College in Minnesota. In 1978, he moved to Columbia University, where he was reunited with Miloš Forman, his former student, with whom he co-chaired the Columbia University School of the Arts Film program. When Robert Redford founded Sundance Institute in 1981, Daniel was recruited by Sundance Executive Director Sterling Van Wagenen to be the Institute's first Artistic Director, a guiding post he held for over a decade. He taught at Columbia University until 1986. After Columbia he became the dean of USC School of Cinema-Television, a post he stepped down from in 1990, continuing to teach screenwriting in the Graduate Screenwriting Division. He continued to develop scripts.
He was an advisor to the Rockefeller Foundation, consultant to David Rockefeller, member of the Academy of Motion Picture Arts and Sciences and the Academy of Television Arts & Sciences. He was married twice and had two sons. Michal, a photographer, and Martin, a film professor.

Daniel lived in Palm Springs, California until his death on February 29, 1996. He was 69 when he died of a heart attack. He is buried at the Forest Lawn Memorial Park in Cathedral City, California.

Books
 1956 Zlatá zeď (Golden Wall) – novel based on his experiences in China
 1956 Cesta za filmovým dramatem (The Path to Film Drama)
 1957 Stručný přehled vývoje evropských dramatických teorií (The Compact Overview of European Dramatic Theories)

Filmography
 Není stále zamračeno (1950), Screenwriter
 O věcech nadpřirozených (1958), Screenwriter
 Kam čert nemůže aka When the Woman Butts In (1959), Screenwriter
 Spadla z Měsíce (1961), Screenwriter
 Hledá se táta (1961), Director/Screenwriter
 Prosím, nebudit (1962), Screenwriter
 Deštivý den (1962), Screenwriter
 Letos v září (1963), Director
 Dva tygři (1966), Screenwriter
 Last Rose from Casanova (1966), Screenwriter
 Přísně tajné premiéry (1967), Screenwriter
 The Shop on Main Street (1968), Producer
 In the Wee Wee Hours... (1987), Producer

References

 1983 "The Czech Difference" in Art and Commitment in the East European Cinema, edited by David W. Paul, pp. 49–56, .

1926 births
1996 deaths
Czech film directors
Czechoslovak film directors
Czech screenwriters
Male screenwriters
Czech male writers
Czech film producers
Film producers from California
People from Palm Springs, California
USC School of Cinematic Arts faculty
Carleton College faculty
Gerasimov Institute of Cinematography alumni
20th-century American businesspeople
Czechoslovak emigrants to the United States
American people of Czech descent
Writers from Kolín
Burials at Forest Lawn Cemetery (Cathedral City)
20th-century screenwriters